The November 1924 Anhalt state elections were held on 9 November 1924 to elect the 36 members of the Landtag of the Free State of Anhalt. They were the second state elections of the year after elections in June, making Anhalt the only state in the Weimar Republic to hold two Landtag elections in the same calendar year.

Results

References

Anhalt 2
1924 11